Iduma Igariwey Enwo (born 5 September 1961) is a Nigerian lawyer and politician. He is a current member of the House of Representative (9th assembly) representing Afikpo North/Afikpo South federal constituency.

Family 
Enwo was born on 5 September 1961 into the family of HRH. Nnachi Enwo Igariwey and Ugo Enwo Igariwey, in Afikpo North Local Government Area of Ebonyi State. He is married to Uka Igariwey Iduma, with children.

Education 
Igariwey attended Community Central School, Ndiagu Echara Ikwo and Sacred Heart Primary School Onueke Ezza, where he obtained his First School Leaving Certificate (FSLC). He then proceeded to Government Secondary School, Owutu Edda and got his West African Senior School Certificate Examination (WASSCE) with distinctions. He obtained his first degree in Political Science from the University of Calabar in 1986, and a law degree (LLB Hons) from the University of Lagos from 1987-1990. He was a student of Yemi Osinbajo at University of Lagos.

Career 
Igariwey's first working experience was as a school teacher at Government Day Secondary School, Rigachikun, Kaduna state where he served his nation at the compulsory one year National Youth Service Corps (NYSC) scheme from 1986 to 1987. He also worked as a junior partner to Chief Okeagu Ogadah in the Law firm of Ogele and Co, Abakaliki, between 1991 and 1992. In 1993 he established a firm of Legal Practitioners known as IGARIWEY & CO, in Afikpo, with himself as the Principal Partner.

Political career 
Igariwey was a legal practitioner between 1991 to 1998.

In 1999, he contested and was elected the executive chairman of Afikpo North Local Government Area of Ebonyi State under the platform of the Peoples Democratic Party (PDP), a position he held till 2007. In March 2015, he was elected into the House of Representatives of Nigerian’s National Assembly. He was re-elected in 2019 and holds the position of Deputy Chairman, Committee on Appropriations.

Seminal contributions 
Hon. Igariwey’s seminal contributions include:

i.	Lecture titled “Corruption and Governance in Nigeria: The Bankruptcy, problematic and limitations of the legislative tool”, delivered at the Department of Sociology, University of Nigeria, Nsukka.

ii.	“Managing violent conflicts in Nigeria: A legislative Perspective” delivered at the National Institute of Policy and Strategic Studies, Kuru, Jos, Nigeria.

iii.	“Local Government Administration in Nigeria” delivered at the Spring lecture series programme of Scott Community College, Iowa, USA.

iv.	Co-authored the Book “Anarchism in Africa” published by See-sharp press, in the United States in 1987.

Bills sponsored 

Most notable Bills in the 9th Assembly concerning the Judiciary which are scheduled for constitutional Amendment include:

1.	A Bill to alter S121 (3) of the 1999 constitution aimed at making the Judiciary and legislature at the State level, more independent and accountable.

2.	A Bill to alter S291 (1) (2) of the 1999 constitution, to increase the retirement age of all Judicial officers of Superior Courts of Record to 70 years.

3.	A Bill to alter S308 of the 1999 constitution to restrict criminal legal proceedings against Justices of the Superior Courts of Record while they serve in their official capacity.

Other bills sponsored 
1.	A Bill for an Act to provide for Federal Agencies Civil Penalties inflation Adjustment Bill

2.	A Bill for an Act to provide for Federal contracting preferences and measures aimed at promoting and encouraging Nigerian Patriot Corporations 2016.

3.	A Bill for an Act to amend the National Automotive Council Act Cap N8 LFN, 2004 to introduce New Automotive vehicular Transportation to Utilize Nigerian Gas 2017.

4.	A Bill to alter S81 of the 1999 constitution to mandatorily allow Public Participation in the formulation of the Annual Budget 2016.

5.	A Bill for an Act to establish Akanu Ibiam Federal University of Science and Technology, to provide training and teaching instructions in every aspect of Education…2020

6.	Private Guards Companies (amendment) Bill 2015, to vest licensing of Private Guard Companies expressly in the hands of the Nigerian Security and Civil Defence Corps. (Co-Sponsor).

7.	A Bill for an Act to Amend section 11 of the Fiscal Responsibility Act Cap F40, LFN 2004, to allow for public participation in the formulation of the Medium Term Expenditure Framework 2016.

References

External links 

 Official profile at National Assembly of Nigeria

1961 births
Living people
20th-century Nigerian lawyers
Members of the House of Representatives (Nigeria)